Mehrban is a 1967 Indian Hindi-language drama film written and directed by A. Bhimsingh, and produced by A. V. Meiyappan. It is a remake of Bhimsingh's own Tamil film Padikkadha Medhai (1960) which itself was a remake of the 1953 Bengali film Jog Biyog, based on the novel of the same name by Ashapurna Devi. The film stars Ashok Kumar, Sunil Dutt, Nutan, Mehmood, Shashikala and Sulochana Latkar. It was released on 21 April 1967.

Plot 
Shanti Swarup, a wealthy businessman, lives with his three sons Ram, Shyam, and Sunder; his wife Parvati; widowed daughter Devki; unmarried daughter Geeta; and adopted orphan Kanhaiya. Kanhaiya is raised as Shanti Swarup's family member and he in return is very dedicated to this family, especially his adopters – Shanti and Parvati. They come across Laxmi whose parents, known to the Swarups, died and so they also bring Laxmi into their family. Parvati wants Sunder to marry Laxmi, but Sunder wants to marry his lover Rachna. Eventually, Kanhaiya marries Laxmi and Sundar marries Rachna.

Shanti arranges for Geeta to marry Ramesh, the son of his friend Lala Karamchand. Financial losses cause Shanti to lose all his wealth. Ram and Shyam refuse to help him at all, and Karamchand cancels the impending marriage. Kanhaiya and Laxmi leave the house due to the instance of Shanti to make him self-dependent and also ill-treatment by his sons. But they are given shelter by Laxmis long-lost brother Madhu who doesn't reveal his identity to Laxmi. Disheartened, depressed and unable to face anyone, Shanti dies. Even as his palatial house is to be auctioned by Karamchand, who is voracious, a devastated Parvati is on her deathbed as she cannot think of living anywhere else, and only a miracle can save the now ruined family.

Kanhaiya saves Karamchand's son Ramesh from a car accident. Thus Karamchand gives the palatial house in favour of Kanhaiya and on turn reunites with the family and fulfils the wishes of Shanti Swaroop.

Cast 
 Ashok Kumar as Shanti Swaroop
 Sunil Dutt as Kanhaiya
 Nutan as Laxmi
 Mehmood as Madhu
 Shashikala as Devki
 Sulochana Latkar as Parvati

Production 
Mehrban was written and directed by A. Bhimsingh and produced by A. V. Meiyappan under AVM Productions. It was remade from Bhimsingh's own Tamil film Padikkadha Medhai (1960), which itself was a remake of the Bengali film Jog Biyog, based on the novel of the same name by Ashapurna Devi. The dialogues were written by Rajendra Krishan. A. K. Sekhar was the art director, A. Paul Duraisingam was the editor, and A. Vincent was cinematographer.

Soundtrack 
The soundtrack was composed by Ravi and the lyrics by Rajinder Krishan.

Release 
Mehrban was released on 21 April 1967, and was distributed by Vidyut.

References

Bibliography

External links 
 

1960s Hindi-language films
1967 drama films
AVM Productions films
Films based on adaptations
Films based on works by Ashapurna Devi
Films directed by A. Bhimsingh
Films scored by Ravi
Hindi remakes of Bengali films
Hindi remakes of Tamil films
Hindi-language drama films
Indian drama films